Kahaluu Fishpond, historically known as Kahouna Fishpond, on Kāneohe Bay in windward Oʻahu, is one of only four surviving ancient Hawaiian fishponds on Oahu that were still in use well into the 20th century. In the previous century there were at least 100 such fishponds around the island. Kahouna was in use until about 1960 and was added to the National Register of Historic Places in 1973, after members of the surrounding community raised concerns that it would be destroyed by development. The Kahaluu Taro Lo'i Historic District was also added to the National Register at that time.

The inner and outer faces of the original wall were of stacked stone, with gravel, coral rubble, and soil as fillers between them.   

Like its larger counterparts at Molii and Heeia, Kahouna Fishpond is now private property. Of the four major fishponds on Oahu, only Huilua Fishpond is open to the public. Kahaluu Pond, Inc., now leases its property for Hawaiian weddings. There is a wedding chapel at one end and a pavilion and garden area at the other, each leased to different vendors. Columbia Pictures also filmed part of The Karate Kid Part II, at the site.

Gallery

References

External links

Archived newspaper clippings detailing the history of dredging and filling of Kahaluu Fish Pond at kauaianthro.org

Archaeological sites on the National Register of Historic Places in Hawaii
Farms on the National Register of Historic Places in Hawaii
History of Oahu
Buildings and structures in Honolulu County, Hawaii
Geography of Honolulu County, Hawaii
Fishponds of Hawaii
Bodies of water of Oahu
National Register of Historic Places in Honolulu County, Hawaii
Protected areas of Oahu